The Rolleston Coal Mine is an open-cut coal mine located in Central Queensland, Australia. The mine has coal reserves amounting to 600 million tonnes of thermal coal. The mine has an annual production capacity of 14 million tonnes run of mine coal. It is one of numerous coal mines in the Bowen Basin.

The mine is jointly owned by Glencore, Sumitomo Corporation and Winfield Energy.  It was acquired by Xstrata after its purchase of Mount Isa Mines in 2003.  Full development of the Rolleston mine was approved by Xstrata in February 2004.  Mining operations begin in 2005. Winfield Energy acquired the 12.5% interest formerly held by Itochu on 8 February 2019.

Rolleston Mine is approved to produce six million tonnes per year for export and two million for domestic use.  Coal from Rolleston Mine leaves the country via the Port of Gladstone.  The majority of the mine's haulage is conducted by Aurizon under contract using electric locomotives.  Coal from the mine is used to power the Gladstone Power Station.

Floods
Excess water filled the mine pits in 2010 affecting production. The mine was forced to declare force majeure after the 2010–2011 Queensland floods affected rail operations.

Expansion
An application to expand the mine was made to the federal government on 17 May 2011.  The mine is located within the Fitzroy River basin which flows into the Coral Sea.  An expansion of mining operations may indirectly affect the Great Barrier Reef Marine Park through sedimentation and the pollution of waterways.  The expansion would lift production almost threefold to between 15 and 20 million tonnes a year.

See also

Coal in Australia
List of mines in Australia

References 

Coal mines in Queensland
Mines in Central Queensland
2005 establishments in Australia
Surface mines in Australia
Itochu